Elections were held in October 2020 for the 26 seats of Ladakh Autonomous Hill Development Council, Leh. The Bharatiya Janata Party won 15 and the Indian National Congress won 9 seats respectively out of the 26 seats. The other 2 seats were won by 2 independent candidates.

Tashi Gyalson was elected the Chief Executive Councillor. The previous elections were held in 2015.

Results

References

Leh district
Politics of Ladakh
2020 elections in India
Elections in Ladakh
History of Ladakh